The Kelso High Campus (abbreviated as KHC) of Denison College of Secondary Education is a government-funded co-educational comprehensive secondary day school campus, located in Kelso, in the Central West region of New South Wales, Australia.

Established in 1976 as Kelso High School, the school amalgamated with Bathurst High School in 2007 to form Denison College of Secondary Education. In 2018 Kelso High Campus enrolled approximately 760 students from Year 7 to Year 12, of whom approximately 15 percent identified as Indigenous Australians and six percent were from a language background other than English. The campus is operated by the NSW Department of Education; and the Campus Principal is Michael Sloan.

History 

Kelso High was established on 27 January 1976 in Waterworks Lane, Gormans Hill, Bathurst. It commenced with a teaching staff of 16, an ancillary staff of 8 and a student enrolment of 236 divided almost equally between Year 7 and Year 8. The school moved to its present site in 1978 and remains on this site, despite a fire that totally destroyed the school in August 2005. The school was housed in demountable buildings while a new school was being built. The new buildings were finished by the end of 2007, three months ahead of schedule. Students started the 2008 school year in the new facilities.

Denison College of Secondary Education 

The 2005 fire which destroyed Kelso High led to the formation of Denison College of Secondary Education. The college was created to share curriculum, facilities and staff between Kelso and Bathurst High campuses in order to enhance student choice.

Notable alumni 

 Gavin Coles - Professional Golfer
 Janelle Lindsay - Paralympic cyclist
 Toireasa Gallagher - Paralympic cyclist
 Ashley Franks - Associate professor, La Trobe University
 George Rose (rugby league) - Professional rugby league player

See also 

 List of government schools in New South Wales
 Education in Australia

References

External links 
 
 
 NSW Schools website

Educational institutions established in 1976
Public high schools in New South Wales
Education in Bathurst, New South Wales
1976 establishments in Australia